Knowledge Elite and the Failure of Prophecy is a 1985 book by Eva Etzioni-Halevy in which the author studies intellectual knowledge in contemporary societies.

Eliška Freiová, Bryan S. Turner, and George Becker have reviewed the book.

References

1985 non-fiction books
Sociology books
Sociology of culture
Works about intellectuals